Lucknuck Creek is a stream in the U.S. state of Mississippi.

Lucknuck is a name derived from the Choctaw language purported to mean "yellow". A variant name is "Lucknow Creek".

References

Rivers of Mississippi
Rivers of Calhoun County, Mississippi
Rivers of Lafayette County, Mississippi
Mississippi placenames of Native American origin